The 2012 Newfoundland and Labrador Tankard men's provincial curling championship, was held February 7-12 at the Carol Curling Club in Labrador City, Newfoundland and Labrador. The winning team of Brad Gushue,  represented Newfoundland and Labrador at the 2012 Tim Hortons Brier in Saskatoon, Saskatchewan.

Teams

Standings

Results
All Times Are Local (NT)

Draw 1
February 8, 2:00 PM

Draw 2
February 8, 7:30 PM

Draw 3
February 9, 9:00 AM

Draw 4
February 9, 3:00 PM

Draw 5
February 10, 1:30PM

Playoffs

Semifinal
February 10, 7:30 PM

Final 1
February 11, 2:30 PM

Final 2 
February 11, 7:30 PM (If Necessary)

* Gushue must be beaten twice

References

Newfoundland and Labrador Tankard
Newfoundland and Labrador Tankard
Curling in Newfoundland and Labrador
Labrador